The Fire Museum of Texas is located in a former fire station, the former Central Fire Station, in Beaumont, Texas, built in 1927.  The building is a Recorded Texas Historic Landmark, and is an example of the Renaissance Revival.  The building houses state-of-the-art interactive fire safety exhibits with a collection of antique fire equipment dating as early as 1856. It also has a two-story interactive playhouse for children to learn fire safety. Another feature is that "...the world's largest working fire hydrant...", a towering twenty-four (24) feet tall, is in front of the building.  In addition to the fire hydrant, the museum features the State of Texas Firefighter Memorial, a 9-11 Memorial, and a Firefighter commemorative walkway.

Permanent exhibits trace history of fire fighting from bucket brigades to present practices.  Several antique trucks are featured dating from 1856.  Temporary exhibits can also be found at the museum.

The museum is part of a concentration of several museums in the downtown Beaumont area.  It is located blocks away from the Tyrrell Historical Library, the Art Museum of Southeast Texas, the Beaumont Children's Museum (temporarily located in the Beaumont Civic Center), and the Edison Museum.

References

External links
 Fire Museum of Texas - official site

Museums established in 1927
Museums in Beaumont, Texas
History museums in Texas
Firefighting museums in the United States
Recorded Texas Historic Landmarks
Fire stations in Texas
Renaissance Revival architecture in Texas
Buildings and structures completed in 1927
1927 establishments in Texas